XT was a metal band from Sweden. It was formed by Bjorn Stigsson and Sonny Larson in 1991, following the breakup of Stigsson's earlier band Leviticus.

The band, whose name means "Christ" released three albums before their breakup in 1995. They became better known in Japan than either Europe or the United States.

Prior to forming XT, Sonny Larson had been involved in a few other Swedish metal bands as lead vocalist. While in Motherlode (1983–1987) he worked with Mark Stanway, who was later in the British melodic rock band Magnum. Motherlode released one album, Sanctuary, in 1986. Following Motherlode, he joined Charizma and stayed with them until 1988.

Beyond Leviticus and XT, Stigsson also released a solo project in 1986 called Together With Friends.

Discography
1992: XT (Viva)
1993: Taxfree (Viva)
1995: Extended Empire (Review: Cross Rhythms)
2017: Saved By The Blood (Talking Music)
2019: Revived ...standing for Jesus Christ (Talking Music)

Members
Bjorn Stiggson - guitar
Sonny Larson - vocalist
Hakan Andersson - bass (-1993)
P-O Larsson - bass (1993–1995)
John Stark - bass (1995+)
Michael Ulvsgärd - drums (-1993)
Mike Nordstrom - drums (1993–1995,2017-2018)
Kjell Andersson - drums (1995+)
Nicklas Jonsson - keyboard (1993+)
Thomas Weinesjö - drums (2018-)

References

Citations
.

Swedish Christian metal musical groups